Pelzer is a town in Anderson County in South Carolina, United States, along the Saluda River. The population was 89 at the 2010 census.

Government
As of 2010 the town was governed by a mayor and four council members. The current Mayor is William Ragland.

History
Pelzer was founded in the 19th century as a mill town around several mill sites (the Lower Mill and the Upper Mill) on the Saluda River developed by the Pelzer Manufacturing Company.  The first (lower) mill was completed in 1882; two additional expansions were referred to as mills 2 and 3, with construction of the 4th mill (the upper mill) starting in 1896.  Pelzer Manufacturing drew power from two dams built along the Saluda River, which generated power with the help of the first generators ever sold by General Electric.  The factory was the first in the country to use incandescent lighting.

The company and town were named for Francis J. Pelzer, who surveyed sites along the river and laid out the town and was along with William Lebby and Ellison A. Smyth one of the founders of Pelzer Manufacturing.  The first president and treasurer of the company was Ellison Adger Smyth, who held the corporate titles for 43 years.  When Smyth decided to build the fourth mill, he initially selected a site four miles downriver from the town along a shoal, necessitating construction of a new mill town.  Eventually, however, Smyth decided to build a new mill at Pelzer and began construction at the Upper Mill site, with power generation coming from the downstream shoals and dam.  This was the first instance of a mill in South Carolina not built immediately adjacent to its power generation facility; Smyth contracted General Electric to build the power lines between the new dam and the existing town, a first in the industry that many competitors argued was doomed to fail.  Smyth allowed GE to use the new Upper Mill as a testing ground for new electric generators and motors, which initially cost Pelzer Manufacturing money and made the new mill a money loser for several years, though it did become profitable in time.

All four mills were designed and built by the architecture firm Lockwood, Greene & Co.  Pelzer Manufacturing was sold in 1923 and the mills changed hands several times.  The final functional owner was Gerber Products Company, which bought the mills in 1986 and made Onesies and other childrenswear until 1990, when the company ceased operations at Pelzer and moved all clothing manufacturing overseas.  The mill properties were bought by Greenlight Enterprises, which destroyed the upper mill in 2004; the lower mill burned in 2012 and 2014.   In 2013, the Pelzer Heritage Commission bought both mill sites.

In the mill town, the mill managers' homes were laid out along what was the town's main street (Lebby St.), which eventually became South Carolina Highway 8.  When the town was initially incorporated, only the main street and adjacent properties were included, so that the management of the mill would retain control of the town; the milltown itself occupied substantially more area than the incorporated town.  In 2015 area residents voted to incorporate substantial additional property into the town limits.

The Pelzer Presbyterian Church was listed on the National Register of Historic Places in 1993.

Community of Pelzer Historical Society was founded in 2008. Ms. Beth Rostron, Founder, President, Treasurer

At least one of the "Dare Stones" purported to tell the story of the lost colonists of Roanoke was found on a hillside across the Saluda River from the town of Pelzer.  This stone found in Pelzer has not been proven to be authentic.

Geography
Pelzer is located in Anderson County, beside the Saluda River.

Demographics

As of the census of 2000, there were 97 people, 35 households, and 26 families residing in the town. The population density was 498.4 people per square mile (197.1/km2). There were 37 housing units at an average density of 190.1 per square mile (75.2/km2). The racial makeup of the town was 95.88% White, 2.06% Native American, and 2.06% from two or more races. Hispanic or Latino of any race were 1.03% of the population.

There were 35 households, out of which 28.6% had children under the age of 18 living with them, 65.7% were married couples living together, 5.7% had a female householder with no husband present, and 25.7% were non-families. 14.3% of all households were made up of individuals, and 2.9% had someone living alone who was 65 years of age or older. The average household size was 2.77 and the average family size was 3.15.

In the town, the population was spread out, with 21.6% under the age of 18, 9.3% from 18 to 24, 29.9% from 25 to 44, 22.7% from 45 to 64, and 16.5% who were 65 years of age or older. The median age was 38 years. For every 100 females, there were 110.9 males. For every 100 females age 18 and over, there were 111.1 males.

The median income for a household in the town was $44,063, and the median income for a family was $55,000. Males had a median income of $43,750 versus $31,250 for females. The per capita income for the town was $21,518. None of the population and none of the families were below the poverty line.

Economy
 Happy Cow Creamery is near Pelzer and has a Pelzer zip code, but it is technically in Ware Place.  A handful of businesses operate along Hwy 8 (Lebby St.) in the mill town, and a Food Lion grocery store occupies a corner where Pelzer and West Pelzer meet.  Across the river, Bargain Foods, a salvage grocer, draws customers from across Greenville and Anderson.
 Meares Auctions, Inc is near Pelzer in Greenville County and has a Pelzer zip code.  It was founded in 1972 and is one of the largest auction companies in South Carolina.
 Mill Town Players is a community theater that operates on Lebby Street. The theater has brought visitors from all over that state and is one of the most attended community theaters in South Carolina.

Photographs
Photographs of the mill, village, and community can be viewed in the Greenville County Library System digital collections.

Notable people
Junior Wooten, professional baseball player.
Shoeless Joe Jackson, professional baseball player, lived in Pelzer as a child and played briefly for the mill team.
William L. McKittrick, Marine Aviator during World War II, who reached the rank of Major General.
Mac Arnold, legendary local blues musician, was born in nearby Ware Place and now lives (and farms) in Pelzer.

References

External links
Town of Pelzer official website
Information about the Town of Pelzer, South Carolina Appalachian Council of Governments

Towns in Anderson County, South Carolina
Towns in South Carolina